The Igorot revolt (Spanish: La Revuelto del Igorot) was a religious revolt in 1601 against Spanish attempts to Christianize the Igorot people of northern Luzon, in the Philippines. Governor-General Francisco de Tello de Guzmán sent Lt. Mateo de Aranda with Spanish  and Filipino colonial troops. The Spaniards were determined to convert the Igorots to Christianity. Another reason for their desire to colonize the Igorots were the presence of gold and the tobacco monopoly in the Cordillera, which the Igorots typically use for ornament and trading.

They launched a crusade to proselytize the highland natives of Luzon and to place them under Spanish authority. In November 1601, Fray Esteban Marín, prior of Laoag, Batac, and Bantay, was sent to pacify the mountain settlements in Cordillera.  He was martyred in the process, with his body tied up to a tree, shot by arrows, before being dismembered.

A strong expedition, consisting of Spanish and Filipino allies (mainly people from Pampanga and Pangasinan) under the command of Lt. Aranda, was then sent to stop the Igorot from resisting colonial subjugation. His battalion, however, was ambushed by 3000 warriors, being wholly decimated with the remaining survivors fleeing down the mountains. Unable to conquer the Zambals, Tinguians, and Igorots, the Spanish encouraged the Filipinos in Pampanga and Pangasinan to fight the Igorots, enslaving any that were captured. Nonetheless, the Igorots would continue to defy and defeat Spanish expeditions in the years 1608, 1635, and 1663.

See also

Philippine revolts against Spain
Military history of the Philippines

References

Battles involving Spain
Conflicts in 1601
17th-century rebellions
Philippine revolts against Spain
History of the Philippines (1565–1898)
1601 in the Philippines
History of Abra (province)
History of Apayao
History of Benguet
History of Ifugao
History of Kalinga (province)
History of Mountain Province
Revolt